Magnamitra is a genus of sea snails, marine gastropod mollusks in the family Mitridae.

Species
Species within the genus Magnamitra include:
 Magnamitra sandrogorii Huang & Salisbury, 2017

References

 Huang S.-I [Shih-I] & Salisbury R. (2017). Magnamitra n. gen. and nomenclatural remarks on large Cancilla and Mitra from Taiwan and the Philippines (Gastropoda: Mitridae). Visaya. 4(6): 19-47

Mitridae
Gastropod genera